Sea Dogs (Корсары) is a 2000 Russian role-playing video game for Microsoft Windows, developed by Akella and published by Bethesda Softworks. In it, the player is the captain of a ship and can serve as a privateer to a European power, or as a pirate. The game uses a custom 3D game engine and includes gameplay similar to Sid Meier's Pirates!, while also being a true inter-character dialog-centered RPG.

The game is often credited as one of the first successful Russian games, which had a notable influence on Russian game industry. It was followed by four sequels, one of which was tied in to Disney's Pirates of the Caribbean franchise.

Plot summary
The player's character, Nicolas Sharp, was raised by his mother since he was a child. The only memories left of his father are his departure on a ship, as well as a golden medallion he gave him. Nicolas grows, and as his father did before, goes to sea to seek adventures. Soon, he is captured by the Spanish, but manages to escape with a small ship and a crew. He arrives at the central British colony, where he has to start a new life.

Since the game is nonlinear, the player may work for any of the three nations, as well as start a pirate's career. Searching for his father is always possible, but in order to succeed, the player will need to change his ship's flags a number of times. This quest will reveal the secrets of the main character's father's life story and his death, as well as his legacy.

Development
The game was announced in March 2000. The game drew inspiration from games like Sid Meier's Pirates!.

Critical reception

Samuel Bass reviewed the PC version of the game for Next Generation, rating it four stars out of five, and stated that "flawed design choices and lack of atmosphere aside, Sea Dogs inarguably remains one of the finest action-trading simulations since the halcyon days of Elite".

Sea Dogs received "average" reviews according to the review aggregation website Metacritic. IGN was impressed with it, calling it "one booty call you won't want to miss". GameSpot was also positive about the game, saying it's "an adventure that can be enthralling despite its many problems".

Sequels
Sea Dogs has received a number of sequels, most of which do not bear the same English title due to legal reasons. The first sequel, Sea Dogs II, was renamed Pirates of the Caribbean when Disney acquired the game in mid-development. Despite being marketed as a tie-in to Pirates of the Caribbean: The Curse of the Black Pearl, which was released around the same time, it is largely unrelated to the plot elements of that film.

The second sequel, Age of Pirates: Caribbean Tales, is a direct sequel to the original Sea Dogs. The title was changed because Akella wanted to create a brand name that they could control, rather than their publisher.

Two indirect sequels would follow: Age of Pirates 2: City of Abandoned Ships and Sea Dogs: To Each His Own in 2009 and 2012, respectively. Caribbean Tales and City of Abandoned Ships would eventually be digitally re-released on GOG and Steam in 2017 under the original Sea Dogs title.

References

External links
 
 

2000 video games
1C Company games
Bethesda Softworks games
Naval video games
Open-world video games
Trade simulation games
Ubisoft games
Video games about pirates
Video games developed in Russia
Windows games
Windows-only games
Akella games
Single-player video games